Adrien D'Hondt was a Belgian rower. He competed at the 1920 Summer Olympics in Antwerp with the men's coxed four where they were eliminated in round one.

References

External links 
 

Year of birth missing
Year of death missing
Belgian male rowers
Olympic rowers of Belgium
Rowers at the 1920 Summer Olympics
Royal Club Nautique de Gand rowers
European Rowing Championships medalists
20th-century Belgian people